Erik Lennart Henry Lindgren (14 April 1915 – 26 April 1952) was a Swedish sprinter who won a silver  medal in the 4 × 100 m relay at the 1938 European Championships. He competed in the 100 m and 4 × 100 m events at the 1936 Summer Olympics, but failed to reach the finals.

References

Athletes (track and field) at the 1936 Summer Olympics
Olympic athletes of Sweden
Swedish male sprinters
1915 births
1952 deaths
European Athletics Championships medalists
Sportspeople from Malmö
20th-century Swedish people